Stromboli was a protected cruiser of the Italian Regia Marina (Royal Navy) built in the 1880s. Her career was relatively uneventful; the only significant action in which she took part was the campaign against the Boxer Uprising in China in 1900. She returned to Italy in 1901 and spent the rest of her career in reserve or as an ammunition ship, apart from a brief stint in active service in 1904. Stromboli was stricken from the naval register in 1907 and sold for scrapping in 1911.

Design

The four ships of the Etna class were designed in Italy as domestically produced versions of the British-built cruiser . The Italian government secured a manufacturing license from the British firm Armstrong Whitworth, but the design was revised by the Italian naval engineer Carlo Vigna. These cruisers were intended to serve as "battleship destroyers", and represented a temporary embrace of the  doctrine by the Italian naval command.

Her crew numbered 12 officers and 296 men. The ship had two horizontal compound steam engines, each driving a single propeller, with steam provided by four double-ended cylindrical boilers.

The main armament of the ships consisted of two Armstrong , 30-caliber breech-loading guns mounted in barbettes fore and aft. She was also equipped with a secondary battery of six , 32-caliber, breech-loading guns that were carried in sponsons along the sides of the ship. For anti-torpedo boat defense, Stromboli was fitted with five  6-pounder Hotchkiss guns and five  1-pounder Hotchkiss guns. Stromboli was also armed with four  torpedo tubes. One was mounted in the bow underwater and the other three were above water. The conning tower had  worth of armor plating.

Service history
Stromboli was laid down at the Venice shipyard on 27 September 1883 and her finished hull was launched on 4 February 1886. Following the completion of fitting-out work, she was commissioned into the Italian fleet on 21 March 1888. She was present during a naval review held for the German Kaiser Wilhelm II during a visit to Italy later that year. Stromboli and her sisters  and  participated in the 1893 naval maneuvers as part of the Active Squadron. On 1 October 1893, she was assigned to the 3rd Department, which was stationed in Venice; she remained there through the following year. Later in 1894, the ship took part in the annual fleet maneuvers in the 1st Division of the Active Squadron, along with the ironclad battleship  and the torpedo cruiser . Beginning on 14 October, the Italian fleet, including Stromboli, assembled in Genoa for a naval review held in honor of King Umberto I at the commissioning of the new ironclad Re Umberto. The festivities lasted three days.

Stomboli and Ettore Fieramosca next participated in the 1896 naval maneuvers as part of the Active Squadron. During this period, she was assigned to the Flying Squadron, along with the armored cruiser  and the protected cruiser . The ships were tasked as a training squadron and were also responsible for responding to any crises that might arise.

In 1899 Stromboli was deployed to the Far East. She was joined by Vesuvio and Ettore Fieramosca, sent there in 1900 to assist the Eight-Nation Alliance in putting down the Boxer Uprising in China. All three ships were assigned to the Cruising Squadron in Chinese waters in 1901. That year, Stromboli returned to Italy and was placed in reserve, before returning to active service in 1904. That year she was in active service  for seven months; she spent the rest of the year with a reduced crew, as was standard practice in the Italian fleet at the time. She later served as an ammunition ship before being struck from the Navy List on 21 March 1907 and sold for scrap in 1911.

Notes

References

External links
 Stromboli Marina Militare website 

Cruisers of Italy
Etna-class protected cruisers
Ships built in Venice
1886 ships
Ships built by Venetian Arsenal